Russell Marcus is a philosopher specializing in philosophy of mathematics and the pedagogy of philosophy. He is Chair of Philosophy at Hamilton College and president of the American Association of Philosophy Teachers.

Education and career 
Prior to his work in philosophy, Marcus taught mathematics and other subjects at high schools in New York City and Costa Rica. He received his doctorate from the City University of New York, where he wrote his dissertation "Numbers without Science". While at graduate school, he taught philosophy and mathematics at Queens College, Hofstra University and the College of Staten Island. He began teaching at Hamilton College in 2007, later setting up the Hamilton College Summer Program in Philosophy. He gained tenure in 2016 and was appointed Chair of Philosophy in 2020. In 2020, he won the American Philosophical Association's Prize for Excellence in Philosophy Teaching which "recognizes a philosophy teacher who has had a profound impact on the student learning of philosophy in undergraduate and/or pre-college settings", being cited as an "important scholar of teaching and learning in philosophy" for his summer program and "inventive team-based pedagogies and exemplary scaffolded assignments".

Books

References

Further reading 

 
 
 
 

Philosophers of mathematics
Philosophers of education
Hamilton College (New York) faculty
City University of New York alumni
Year of birth missing (living people)
Living people